Cheltenham & Gloucester Building Society v Norgan [1996] 1 WLR 343 is an English land law case, concerning mortgage arrears.

Under section 36 Administration of Justice Act 1970 (as amended), the lender should, for an owner-occupier mortgage borrower facing temporary income difficulties set a clearly sustainable payment plan based on good evidence assessed such as, if proportionate to its own expected interests, to pay off the arrears over all of the remaining term of the mortgage rather than necessarily the shortest payment plan possible. This will spare the high cost and inconvenience to the borrower of the lender's repeated applications to the court for a Final Possession Order if the arrears continue to accumulate on facts where the court is merely likely spread out further the repayment of the arrears.

The panel of judges unanimously overturned the courts below and rebuked the parties' repeated applications which resulted in a series of court hearings and orders — each imposing more affordable payment plans still within the term of the mortgage. It instead issued an eightfold list of criteria for future court cases to look to in assessing what order they will make in relation to arrears, taking into account expert evidence including factors cited by the Council of Mortgage Lenders; the aim being to avoid either side engaging in frequent applications ("vexatious litigation") or other abuse of judicial process.

Facts
Mrs Norgan borrowed £90,000 repayable each month along with interest over 22 years (i.e. on a repayment mortgage), secured on the family farmhouse. Rates were initially % in the 1970s and with the Bank of England base rate fluctuated. When she fell behind, C&G sought possession, and this was stayed on several occasions. As they built up C&G tried again.

Judgment
Waite LJ, 353, ‘the court should take as its starting point the full term of the mortgage and pose at the outset the question: “Would it be possible for the mortgagor to maintain payment-off of the arrears by instalments over that period?”’ The courts would probably need to consider more comprehensive accounts and financial information, but that and accompanying practical difficulties ‘should not however be allowed, in my judgment, to stand in the way of giving effect to the clearly intended scheme of the legislation.’ They had been to court many times and C&G was adding the cost of its proceedings to the bill against Mrs Norgan and her husband, who were struggling along. These will ultimately have to be paid and that shows the disadvantage of multiple and continued applications to court under the Administration of Justice Act 1970 section 36.

Evans LJ agreed:

The court therefore remitted the case to the county court for an application to adduce further evidence, assisting with forming a resolute judgment under these criteria.

See also

English land law
English trusts law
English property law

Similar cases
Bristol & West Building Society v Ellis [1996] EWCA Civ 1294

References

External links
 In The Independent

English land case law
1996 in case law
1996 in British law
Court of Appeal (England and Wales) cases